Bill Johnson may refer to:

Entertainment
William Manuel Johnson (1872–1972), known as Bill, American double bass player and founder of King Oliver's Creole Jazz Band
Bill Johnson (reed player) (1912–1960), American alto saxophonist, clarinetist, and arranger
Bill Johnson (banjoist) (died 1955), American jazz banjoist and guitarist
Bill Johnson (blues musician), Canadian singer-songwriter and guitarist
Bill Johnson (musical theatre actor) (1916–1957), American actor and singer of stage and screen
Bill Johnson (film and television actor) (born 1951), American actor known for The Texas Chainsaw Massacre 2
Bill Johnson (New Zealand actor) (1924–2016), New Zealand actor
Bill Johnson (filmmaker), American film and television editor

Politics
Bill Johnson (Ohio politician) (born 1954), U.S. Representative from Ohio
Bill Johnson (Kentucky politician) (born 1965), unsuccessful Republican candidate for Secretary of State of Kentucky, 2011
William A. Johnson Jr. (born 1942), known as Bill, first African-American mayor of Rochester, New York

Sports

American football
Bill Johnson (defensive end) (1916–2002), American football defensive end
Bill Johnson (center) (1926–2011), American football player (San Francisco 49ers) and coach (Cincinnati Bengals)
Bill Johnson (guard) (1936–2020), American football player
Bill Johnson (punter) (born 1944), football player with the New York Giants
Bill Johnson (American football coach) (born 1955)
Bill Johnson (running back) (born 1960), American football player
Bill Johnson (defensive tackle) (born 1968), American football defensive lineman

Baseball
Bill Johnson (1890s outfielder) (1862–1942), Major League Baseball outfielder
Bill Johnson (1910s outfielder) (1892–1950), Major League Baseball outfielder
Bill Johnson (catcher) (1895–1988), American Negro leagues baseball catcher
Bill Johnson (1940s outfielder), American Negro leagues outfielder
Bill Johnson (pitcher) (1960–2018), Major League Baseball pitcher

Other sports
Bill Johnson (footballer, born 1882) (1882–1952), Australian rules footballer for South Melbourne and St Kilda
Bill Johnson (footballer, born 1886) (1886–1964), Australian rules footballer for Essendon and Carlton
Bill Johnson (footballer, born 1900), English footballer
Bill Johnson (rugby league) (1916–1997), rugby league footballer of the 1930s, for Wales, and Huddersfield
Bill Johnson (cricketer) (born 1959), English cricketer, Durham CCC
Bill Johnson (skier) (1960–2016), American skier

Other people
Bill Johnson (pastor) (born 1951), American revivalist, pastor and author
Bill Johnson (author) (born late 1950s), science fiction writer
Bill Johnson (scientist) (1922–2010), British academic

See also
Bill Johnston (disambiguation)
Billy Johnson (disambiguation)
Will Johnson (disambiguation)
William Johnson (disambiguation)
Willie Johnson (disambiguation)